Fiordaliza Cofil (born 27 October 2000) is an athlete from the Dominican Republic who competes as a sprinter. She won the gold medal in the mixed 4 x 400 metres relay at the 2022 World Athletics Championships. Cofil holds Dominican Republic records in the 100 metres, as well as the women's and mixed 4×400 m relay.

At the 2022 World Championships in Eugene, Oregon, Cofil ran the anchor leg of the mixed 4x400 m relay and chased down American Kennedy Simon to clinch only the third ever gold medal at the Games for her country (alongside Lidio Andrés Feliz, Marileidy Paulino and Alexander Ogando).

Achievements

International competitions

Circuit wins
 Diamond League
 2022 (400 m): Brussels Memorial Van Damme

Personal bests
 100 metres – 11.16 (+0.8 m/s, Santo Domingo June 2022) 
 200 metres – 22.87 (+1.0 m/s, Santo Domingo June 2022)
 400 metres – 49.80 (Brussels September 2022)

References

2000 births
Living people
Dominican Republic female sprinters
World Athletics Championships winners
21st-century Dominican Republic women
World Athletics Championships athletes for the Dominican Republic